Garmania is a genus of mites in the family Laelapidae.

Species
 Garmania bombophila Westerboer, 1963
 Garmania caucasica Byglarov, 1973
 Garmania domesticus (Oudemans, 1929)
 Garmania mali (Oudemans)

References

Laelapidae